The Mougins Center of Photography (Centre de Photographie de Mougins) is a photography gallery located in the village of Mougins, in the Alpes-Maritimes department, France. It opened in July 2021.

The rehabilitation was financed by the municipality as well as by the Provence-Alps-French Riviera administrative region. Its inaugural exhibition was by Isabel Muñoz.

François Cheval is the gallery's artistic director and independent curator and Yasmine Chemali is its manager.

See also
Mougins Museum of Classical Art

References

External links

Museums in Alpes-Maritimes
2021 establishments in France
Art galleries established in 2021
Art museums and galleries in France
Photography museums and galleries in France